East Church may refer to:
Oosterkerk, a 17th-century Dutch Reformed church in Amsterdam
East Church, Inverness, a parish church in the Church of Scotland
East Church, Aberdeen, rebuilt as the Kirk of St Nicholas, in Scotland

See also
Eastchurch, a village in Kent, England
Church of the East (disambiguation)